= TtE library =

Coordinates: 50°57′08″N 6°57′15″E

The TtE library is a library and archive of left-wing social movements. It is located in the community center Alte Feuerwache in Cologne, Germany. The library emerged from a reading circle in Leverkusen in connection with the youth center movement in the mid-1980s. It moved to Cologne in the early 1990s. An estimated one-quarter of its holdings consist of so-called gray literature. Its holdings of approximately 16,000 books and brochures are freely accessible and systematically arranged. There are also about 1400 magazine titles published by citizens' initiatives, women's projects, self-help groups and various political contexts.

The TtE library in Schwerin is a sister library. The TtE library is a member of the research association Fédération internationale des centres d'études et de documentation libertaires (FICEDL).

The abbreviation TtE in the name of the library refers to the former club location TT Embargo of the Leverkusen Förder- und Trägerverein selbstverwaltete Jugendzentren e.V. or the boycott of the Isle of Man Tourist Trophy.
